William Henry Johnston  (21 December 1879 – 8 June 1915) was a British soldier and recipient of the Victoria Cross, the highest and most prestigious award for gallantry in the face of the enemy that can be awarded to British and Commonwealth forces.

Born 21 December 1879 in Leith, Edinburgh to Maj. William Johnston and Mary Johnston. Johnston was a captain in the 59th Field Company, Corps of Royal Engineers, British Army. He was 34 years old, on 14 September 1914 during the Race to the Sea at Missy, France, in the First World War, he performed an act of bravery for which he was awarded the Victoria Cross.

His citation read:

Johnston afterwards served with the tunnelling companies of the Royal Engineers at St Eloi in the Ypres Salient. Mining activity by the Royal Engineers began at St Eloi in early 1915. The Germans exploded mines under the area known as The Mound just south-east of St Eloi in March 1915 and in the ensuing fighting the British suffered some 500 casualties. Much of the British tunnelling in this sector was done by the 177th and 172nd Tunnelling Company, the latter commanded in early 1915 by Captain William Henry Johnston VC. Johnston left 172nd Tunnelling Company in early May and was killed in action at Ypres on 8 June 1915. He eventually achieved the rank of major.

His Victoria Cross is displayed at the Royal Engineers Museum, Chatham, Kent.

References

Monuments to Courage (David Harvey, 1999)
The Register of the Victoria Cross (This England, 1997)
The Sapper VCs (Gerald Napier, 1998)
Scotland's Forgotten Valour (Graham Ross, 1995)
VCs of the First World War - 1914 (Gerald Gliddon, 1994)

External links

1879 births
1915 deaths
British Army personnel of World War I
British World War I recipients of the Victoria Cross
Royal Engineers officers
British military personnel killed in World War I
People from Leith
British Army recipients of the Victoria Cross
Burials at Perth (China Wall) Commonwealth War Graves Commission Cemetery
Military personnel from Edinburgh